Rocket to You! '93-'99 is a compilation album released by The Manges in 1999, and one of the first albums to be released by the band in the United States.

Track listing
 Mandy
 Zombie
 My Direction
 Do My Stuff
 Only You Are the Girl That Hits the Gas
 She's A Punk
 Oh, Mary
 Break Up Your Radio
 Summer's Gone
 Ruin Myself With Road to Ruin
 Teen Angel
 Melissa Is A Rockabilly Rebel
 I Hate You, David
 Time Bomb
 The Only Cool Girl in Ladbroke Grove
 Manges Are Back!
 Richie's Party
 Me or You
 Munster Beat
 Dunkin' Donna
 Rocket to You

Track Origins 
 1 from Mandy/Breakdown (1999)
 2
 3 from Be Nice To Mommy Vol. 1 (2000)
 4 from Split with Boyz Nex' Door (1995)
 5,6 from I Was A Teenage Rocker (1996)
 7 from Galactic Punk (Split with Egg Ebb) (1997)
 8,9,10,11 from Break Up Your Radio (1997)
 12,13 from Split with Raggity Anne (1998)
 14 from  "Gabba Gabba Hey !" Shit Punk 'Zine - Numero 3 (1997)
 15 from All Good Cretins Go To Heaven (1998)
 16 
 17 from Zombie Shake Vol. 1 (1999)
 18
 19,20 from Clean Cut Kids (1999)
 21

1999 compilation albums
The Manges albums